This is a list of U.S. cities whose official names have diacritics.

Alaska 
 Utqiaġvik

American Samoa 

 Āfono
 Ālega
 'Āmanave
 Āmouli
 Aūa
 Fagasā
 Faleāsao
 Lumā
 Tāfuna

California 
 La Cañada Flintridge, Los Angeles County
 Los Baños, Merced County
 Piñon Hills, San Bernardino County
 San José, Santa Clara County

Colorado 
 Cañon, Conejos County
 Cañon City
 Piñon, Montrose County
 Piñon, Pueblo County
 Piñon Acres, La Plata County

Guam 
 Hagåtña
 Hagåtña Heights

Hawaii 
City names in Hawaii often use the ʻokina, not to be confused with the apostrophe.

 Āhuimanu
 Āinaloa
 Hanapēpē
 Haikū-Pauwela
 Hālawa
 Hāliimaile
 Hāmoa, Maui County
 Hāna
 Hāōū
 Hāwī
 Hīlea, Hawaii County
 Hōlualoa
 Hōnaunau-Nāpōopoo
 Honokōhau, Maui County
 Hoōpūloa, Hawaii County
 Kāanapali
 Kaimū
 Kākio, Maui County
 Kalāheo
 Kamalō, Maui County
 Kāneohe
 Kaupō
 Kaūpūlehu
 Keālia
 Kēōkea, Hawaii County
 Kēōkea, Maui County
 Kīhei
 Kīholo, Hawaii County
 Kīlauea
 Kīpahulu
 Kīpū, Maui County
 Kōloa
 Kūkaiau, Hawaii County
 Kūkiʻo, Hawaii County
 Lāie
 Lānai City
 Laupāhoehoe
 Lāwai
 Līhue
 Māalaea
 Māili
 Mākaha
 Mākaha Valley
 Mākena
 Mānā, Hawaii County
 Mokulēia
 Mōpua, Maui County
 Mūolea, Maui County
 Nāālehu
 Nāhiku
 Nānākuli
 Nānāwale Estates
 Nāpili-Honokōwai
 Nīnole, Hāmākua District, Hawaii County
 Nīnole, Kaū District, Hawaii County
 Ōmao
 Ōmaopio, Maui County
 Ōōkala
 Pāauhau
 Pāhala
 Pāhoa
 Pāia
 Pākalā Village
 Pālehua, Honolulu County
 Pāpā Bay Estates, Hawaii County
 Pāpaaloa
 Pāpaikou
 Poipū
 Puaākala, Hawaii County
 Pūālaa, Hawaii County
 Puakō
 Pūkoo, Maui County
 Pūlehu, Maui County
 Pūpūkea
 Puunēnē
 Wahiawā
 Wahīlauhue, Maui County
 Waikāne
 Waikapū
 Waimānalo
 Waimānalo Beach
 Waiōhinu
 Waipāhoehoe, Hawaii County
 Welokā, Hawaii County

Louisiana 
 Pointe à la Hache
 West Pointe à la Hache

Minnesota 
 Arnesén, Lake of the Woods County
 Lindström

New Mexico 

 Cañada de los Alamos
 Cañon, Mora County
 Cañon, Sandoval County
 Cañoncito, Bernalillo County
 Cañoncito, Rio Arriba County
 Cañoncito, Santa Fe County
 Cañoncito, Taos County
 Cañones
 Doña Ana
 Española
 Lower Cañones, Rio Arriba County
 Peña Blanca
 Peñasco
 Peñasco Blanco, San Miguel County
 Piñon
 Señorito, Sandoval County

Puerto Rico 

 Añasco
 Bayamón
 Canóvanas
 Cataño
 Comerío
 Guánica
 Juana Díaz
 Las Marías
 Loíza
 Manatí
 Mayagüez
 Peñuelas
 Rincón
 Río Grande
 San Germán
 San Sebastián
 Cañabón, a ward of Caguas, Puerto Rico
 Castañer, Puerto Rico
 Río Piedras, Puerto Rico

Texas 
 César Chávez
 La Peñusca, Cameron County
 Lopeño
 Peñitas
 Salineño
 Salineño North

References 

Diacritics
United States Cities